WBMW (106.5 FM) is an adult contemporary music formatted radio station. WBMW is licensed to Pawcatuck, Connecticut, and serving the New London, Connecticut, area. The station is owned by John Fuller's Red Wolf Broadcasting. WBMW broadcasts with an ERP of 12.5 kW.

History
The station was assigned the call letters WVNL on August 9, 1991. On November 1, 1991, the station changed its call sign to the current WBMW; under this call sign, it signed on December 24, 1992. WBMW changed its city of license from Ledyard, Connecticut, to Pawcatuck on August 22, 2013.

Prior WBMW
Two other unrelated stations have held the call sign WBMW. WJFK-FM held this call sign from 1985 to 1988, with a new age format, and WLKK held this call sign from 1988 to 1991, and had a smooth jazz format.

References

External links
 

 
 
 
 

BMW
Mainstream adult contemporary radio stations in the United States
Radio stations established in 1992
1992 establishments in Connecticut
Stonington, Connecticut